In differential geometry, a one-form on a differentiable manifold is a smooth section of the cotangent bundle. Symbolically,

where  is linear.

Often one-forms are described locally, particularly in local coordinates.  In a local coordinate system, a one-form is a linear combination of the differentials of the coordinates:

From this perspective, a one-form has a covariant transformation law on passing from one coordinate system to another. Thus a one-form is an order 1 covariant tensor field.

Examples

The most basic non-trivial differential one-form is the "change in angle" form  This is defined as the derivative of the angle "function"  (which is only defined up to an additive constant), which can be explicitly defined in terms of the atan2 function. Taking the derivative yields the following formula for the total derivative:

While the angle "function" cannot be continuously defined – the function atan2 is discontinuous along the negative -axis – which reflects the fact that angle cannot be continuously defined, this derivative is continuously defined except at the origin, reflecting the fact that infinitesimal (and indeed local)  in angle can be defined everywhere except the origin. Integrating this derivative along a path gives the total change in angle over the path, and integrating over a closed loop gives the winding number times 

In the language of differential geometry, this derivative is a one-form, and it is closed (its derivative is zero) but not exact (it is not the derivative of a 0-form, that is, a function), and in fact it generates the first de Rham cohomology of the punctured plane. This is the most basic example of such a form, and it is fundamental in differential geometry.

Differential of a function

In terms of the de Rham cochain complex, one has an assignment from zero-forms (scalar functions) to one-forms; that is,

See also

References

Differential forms
1 (number)